In geometry, a uniform honeycomb or uniform tessellation or infinite uniform polytope, is a vertex-transitive honeycomb made from uniform polytope facets. All of its vertices are identical and there is the same combination and arrangement of faces at each vertex. Its dimension can be clarified as -honeycomb for an -dimensional honeycomb.

An -dimensional uniform honeycomb can be constructed on the surface of -spheres, in -dimensional Euclidean space, and -dimensional hyperbolic space. A 2-dimensional uniform honeycomb is more often called a uniform tiling or uniform tessellation.

Nearly all uniform tessellations can be generated by a Wythoff construction, and represented by a Coxeter–Dynkin diagram. The terminology for the convex uniform polytopes used in uniform polyhedron, uniform 4-polytope, uniform 5-polytope, uniform 6-polytope, uniform tiling, and convex uniform honeycomb articles were coined by Norman Johnson.

Wythoffian tessellations can be defined by a vertex figure. For 2-dimensional tilings, they can be given by a vertex configuration listing the sequence of faces around every vertex. For example,  represents a regular tessellation, a square tiling, with 4 squares around each vertex. In general an -dimensional uniform tessellation vertex figures are define by an -polytope with edges labeled with integers, representing the number of sides of the polygonal face at each edge radiating from the vertex.

Examples of uniform honeycombs

See also
 Uniform tiling
 List of uniform tilings
 Uniform tilings in hyperbolic plane
 Honeycomb (geometry)
 Wythoff construction
 Convex uniform honeycomb
 List of regular polytopes

References 
 George Olshevsky, Uniform Panoploid Tetracombs, Manuscript (2006) (Complete list of 11 convex uniform tilings, 28 convex uniform honeycombs, and 143 convex uniform tetracombs)
 Branko Grünbaum, Uniform tilings of 3-space. Geombinatorics 4(1994), 49–56.
 Norman Johnson Uniform Polytopes, Manuscript (1991)

 
 H. S. M. Coxeter, Regular Polytopes, 3rd Edition, Dover New York, 1973
 
 N.W. Johnson: The Theory of Uniform Polytopes and Honeycombs, Ph.D. Dissertation, University of Toronto, 1966
 A. Andreini, Sulle reti di poliedri regolari e semiregolari e sulle corrispondenti reti correlative (On the regular and semiregular nets of polyhedra and on the corresponding correlative nets), Mem. Società Italiana della Scienze, Ser.3, 14 (1905) 75–129.

External links 
 
 Tessellations of the Plane
 

Uniform tilings
Honeycombs (geometry)